Capital punishment is a legal punishment in the Sultanate of Brunei Darussalam.  The last execution was in 1957.

Capital crimes in Brunei include murder, terrorism, drug trafficking, armed robbery, abetting suicide, arson, piracy, aircraft hijacking, kidnapping, sedition, treason, mutiny, perjury, and as of 2019, homosexuality.

In April 2014, Brunei introduced a new penal code which implemented elements of Sharia law and instituted the death penalty (by stoning) for adultery, sodomy, rape, apostasy, blasphemy, and insulting Islam.

The legal methods of execution in Brunei are hanging and, since 2014, stoning.

Currently, it is estimated that there are about six individuals on death row in Brunei.  The last known death sentence was handed out in 2017], and one death sentence was commuted in 2009.

References

Brunei
Law of Brunei
Sharia in Asia
Human rights abuses in Brunei